The 2016 Pacific Rim Gymnastics Championships is the fifteenth edition of the Pacific Rim Gymnastics Championships. The competition was held April 8–10, 2016 at the Xfinity Arena (for artistic and trampoline events) and the Everett Community College (for rhythmic events) – both of which are in Everett, Washington. The 2016 event marks the fifth time that the Championships have been held in the United States, and the second time in Everett (the first being 2012).

The event served as the second international team elite competition for the U.S. women's national team (after the City of Jesolo Trophy) and the first for the men's team.

Background
On March 17, 2015, American national gymnastics governing body USA Gymnastics announced that Everett had been selected to host the Championships for the 2016 edition – a result of the successful event in 2012. USA Gymnastics president Steve Penny said the 2012 championships were "the best Pacific Rim  gymnastics event we've [USA Gymnastics] ever held". The 2012 event drew an attendance of 20,343 over three days competition; more than four times higher than the previous 2008 event in San Jose, California. The 2012 event amassed a profit of around $2.5 million.

Promotion 
In February 2016, Olympians Carly Patterson and Shawn Johnson visited the Seattle metropolitan area to promote the event at a sports award ceremony.

Venues 

Opened on September 27, 2003, as the Everett Events Center, the arena is home to the WHL hockey team Everett Silvertips and the Tilted Thunder Rail Birds roller derby team. Additionally, the arena hosted the 2008 Skate America and several other sporting and exhibition events. The arena had a capacity of 6,200 for the 2012 event but some arena floor area was used to cater for additional seating.

Unlike the 2012 event where all events were contested at the Xfinity Arena, the organizers have decided to use nearby Everett Community College to host the rhythmic gymnastics events. Although it hasn't been confirmed, it is thought that the events will take place in the Gray Wolf Hall. The college's athletic mascot is a Trojan and the hall hosts volleyball matches.

Broadcast
NBC Sports televised the event. The women's team and all-around competitions were aired through tape-delayed coverage on NBC.

Additionally, 2008 Olympians Samantha Peszek and Jonathan Horton, along with Evan Heiter, presented live YouTube coverage of the competition.

Participating nations
The following nations participated in the competition:
  Australia
  Canada
  China
  Chinese Taipei
  Colombia
  Costa Rica
  Ecuador
  Honduras
  Hong Kong
  Japan
  Mexico
  New Zealand
  Philippines
  Singapore
  United States

Medalists

Artistic gymnastics

Men's events

Women's events

Rhythmic gymnastics

Women's results

Team final

Individual All-around

References

Pacific Rim Championships
International gymnastics competitions hosted by the United States
Sports competitions in Washington (state)
Pacific Rim Gymnastics
Pacific Rim Gymnastics
Pacific Rim Gymnastics
Pacific Rim Gymnastics